The umpiring panel for the 2007 Cricket World Cup comprised nine umpires from the Elite Panel of ICC Umpires (the only member not included was Darrell Hair), and nine umpires from the international panel. The refereeing panel comprises seven members from the Elite Panel of ICC Referees, with Clive Lloyd not being included due to his role as West Indies' team manager. Aleem Dar went on to stand as an umpire in his first World Cup final, alongside Steve Bucknor who was appearing in his fifth final in a row - extending his record of four from the 2003 World Cup.

Umpires

From the International Panel, Russell Tiffin of Zimbabwe, Nigel Llong of England and Suresh Shastri of India were identified as the reserve umpires, should a member of the above panel have become unavailable. None were eventually called on by the end of the tournament.

* Norman Malcolm and Goland Greaves only officiated in one match each, both acting as Fourth umpire.

Referees

Seven of the eight members of the Panel of ICC Referees were included in the roster to perform match refereeing duties throughout the tournament. The only member to be left out was Clive Lloyd due to his commitment as coach of the West Indies cricket team; however he announced his retirement from match refereeing towards the end of the Super 8 stage of the competition.

Match appointments

Group stage appointments

Super 8 stage appointments
Umpires:
Only umpires from the Elite Panel of ICC Umpires officiated from the Super Eight stage of the competition until its conclusion.

Referees:
Chris Broad, Mike Procter, Jeff Crowe, Ranjan Madugalle were chosen to officiate the matches from the Super Eight stage onwards.

Semi-finals

After a review of the performance of the umpires throughout the tournament the best four umpires were appointed to officiate on-field in the semi-finals. The role of third umpire will be filled by the two next best umpires, and likewise for the fourth umpire appointments.

Of the appointed umpires, Bucknor and Koertzen have stood on-field before in World Cup semi-finals. Taufel and Dar served as third and fourth umpires respectively in the semi-finals of the previous tournament in 2003.

Final
The two on-field umpires for the final were chosen after a performance review, such that they are the two best umpires from the tournament (independent of the competing nations). The third and fourth umpire roles were filled by the same process.

Since the officials had to be independent of the two nations participating in the final, Simon Taufel and Daryl Harper were ineligible to umpire, whilst Ranjan Madugalle could not serve as the match referee.

This was Aleem Dar's first appointment in a World Cup final, and prior to the match had said that it was to be the most important game of his career to date. Steve Bucknor, on the other hand, stood in his fifth consecutive World Cup final, extending his previous record of four in a row, though this competition held a special note, having been held in his native West Indies. He said that this appointment was a dream come true.

Criticism of umpires
Whilst the majority of the tournament passed without any major criticism of the umpires or errors on their part, the Final was wrought with confusion and was described as a "farcical finish" to the competition.

Rain affected the start of the match, reducing the contest to 38 overs a side, and further rain reduced the Sri Lankan innings to 36 overs. With Australia almost certain victors with just 3 overs to go, bad light began to affect play and the umpires seemed to offer the Sri Lankans the opportunity to leave the field for bad light. Both teams assumed this would have granted Australia victory that evening, but they were soon informed that if the light improved the match would have to continue; and if not then the final 3 overs would be played the next day. Sri Lanka's batsmen eventually came out and played out the final 3 overs regardless, and Australia were eventually crowned champions.

Match referee Jeff Crowe revealed a "communication breakdown" between himself, on-field umpires Aleem Dar and Steve Bucknor and third umpire Rudi Koertzen was to blame for the mix-up, which overlooked Law 21 of the laws of cricket. The law states that, in a One Day International, providing a minimum of 20 overs have been played then a result can be reached using the Duckworth-Lewis system.

The ICC issued a statement apologising for occurrence of the incident, but said that none of those involved would be sacked. Two months later it was announced that all five officials involved - the two on field umpires, the third and fourth umpires and the match referee - were to be reprimanded by suspension to prevent them officiating in the 2007 Twenty20 World Championship.

Notes and references

umpires